The 2015–16 Gabon Championnat National D1 is the 48th season in top-flight Gabonese football. AS Mangasport are the defending champions having won their eighth title.

Participating teams
Fourteen teams competed in the 2015–16 season.

Stadia and locations

League table

References

Gabon Championnat National D1 seasons
Championnat National D1
Championnat National D1
Gabon